William Boys (1541–1596) was an English politician.

He was a Member (MP) of the Parliament of England for Queenborough in 1589.

References

1541 births
1596 deaths
English MPs 1589